William J. Scott (November 11, 1926 – June 22, 1986) was an American lawyer and politician.

Born in Chicago, Illinois, Scott served in the United States Naval Air Corps during World War II. He then received his law degree from Chicago–Kent College of Law in 1950 and then practiced law. In 1959, he helped the United States Government with a crackdown on organized crime. He then became vice president of a bank.

In 1962, he was elected Illinois State Treasurer, as a Republican, and served until 1967.

In 1969 he served as Illinois Attorney General until 1980.

In 1980 he unsuccessfully sought the Republican nomination for U.S. Senate.

He was indicted and convicted for understating his 1972 United States income tax in 1972 and in 1982 while running for the US Senate, he was found guilty and sentenced to a year and a day in prison. He died at his home, in Palos Heights, Illinois, of a heart attack.

Notes

1926 births
1986 deaths
Politicians from Chicago
Chicago-Kent College of Law alumni
Businesspeople from Chicago
Illinois Republicans
Illinois Attorneys General
State treasurers of Illinois
Illinois politicians convicted of crimes
20th-century American businesspeople
20th-century American politicians